Anjulie is the debut studio album by the Canadian recording artist Anjulie, released by Starbucks record label Hear Music on August 4, 2009 in Canada and the United States. It was produced by John Burk, Jon Levine, The Transcenders and Colin Wolfe and reached number two on the US Billboard Heatseekers Albums chart.

The album received generally positive reviews from critics, with Allmusic noting that "while the record's not without its rough patches, dully derivative moments, and false notes, Anjulie is quite impressive as an opening salvo from a talented musical collagist whose minor flurry of hype is well-warranted."

Track listing

Charts

References

External links
 AnjulieMusic.com — official site

2009 debut albums
Hear Music albums
Albums produced by Jon Levine
Anjulie albums